Ammocryptocharax is a genus of South American darters.  There are currently four described species in this genus.

Species
 Ammocryptocharax elegans S. H. Weitzman & Kanazawa, 1976
 Ammocryptocharax lateralis (C. H. Eigenmann, 1909)
 Ammocryptocharax minutus Buckup, 1993
 Ammocryptocharax vintonae (C. H. Eigenmann, 1909)

References
 

Crenuchidae
Taxa named by Stanley Howard Weitzman
Characiformes genera
Fish of South America